Gillian Thurlow is a former association football player who represented New Zealand at international level.

Thurlow made a single appearance for Football Ferns in a 2–1 win over Australia on 14 October 1994.

References

Year of birth missing (living people)
Living people
New Zealand women's association footballers
New Zealand women's international footballers
Women's association footballers not categorized by position